The 2016 AAA 400 Drive for Autism was a NASCAR Sprint Cup Series race held on May 15, 2016, at Dover International Speedway in Dover, Delaware. Contested over 400 laps on the 1-mile (1.6 km) concrete speedway, it was the 12th race of the 2016 NASCAR Sprint Cup season. The race had 19 lead changes among different drivers, and twelve cautions for 65 laps, along with a red-flag period of 11 minutes, 22 seconds.

Report

Background

Dover International Speedway is an oval race track in Dover, Delaware, United States that has held at least two NASCAR races since it opened in 1969. In addition to NASCAR, the track also hosted USAC and the Verizon IndyCar Series. The track features one layout, a  concrete oval, with 24° banking in the turns and 9° banking on the straights. The speedway is owned and operated by Dover Motorsports.

The track, nicknamed "The Monster Mile", was built in 1969 by Melvin Joseph of Melvin L. Joseph Construction Company, Inc., with an asphalt surface, but was replaced with concrete in 1995. Six years later in 2001, the track's capacity moved to 135,000 seats, making the track have the largest capacity of sports venue in the mid-Atlantic. In 2002, the name changed to Dover International Speedway from Dover Downs International Speedway after Dover Downs Gaming and Entertainment split, making Dover Motorsports. From 2007 to 2009, the speedway worked on an improvement project called "The Monster Makeover", which expanded facilities at the track and beautified the track. After the 2014 season, the track's capacity was reduced to 95,500 seats.

Entry list
Forty cars are entered for the race.

First practice
Four minutes into the session, Danica Patrick's engine expired, dumped oil onto the track, spun and caught fire on the frontstretch. Jamie McMurray and Tony Stewart were caught in the oil and slammed the wall. All three went to backup cars. Patrick said afterwards that "there was oil, a fire and the car spun and was caught by the wall. I'm not sure what happened, but this is obviously not something we normally see. You don't see a lot of failures like that. I'm sure they will figure out what it is. It sucks when it takes other people with you."

Harvick, speaking on his teammate's wreck on a part of the outside wall not reinforced with SAFER barriers, said that they've been put "in the groove at Darlington and it's two-and-a-half cars wide. So, there's really no excuse not to have it in my opinion. ... We don't wear our helmets and HANS devices for the impacts that we are prepared for. We wear those things for the instances where those one-off things can happen like happened today."

Qualifying
Kevin Harvick claimed the pole after a rained out qualifying session. The starting grid was set on times from the first practice. Dale Earnhardt Jr., who started second, said he hoped "we will get some practice tomorrow to get to work on the race set-up a little bit. We just ran in qualifying trim today. The car was not real close when we came off the trailer, but they made some great adjustments and got some good speed out of it, got it real comfortable. I like this track. It is challenging to run the way you want to run every lap, lap after lap, and that is a fun challenge."

Qualifying results

Practice (post-qualifying)

Second practice

Final practice

Race

First half

Start
Under mostly sunny Delaware skies, Kevin Harvick led the field to the green flag at 1:16 p.m. After five laps, he pulled to a one-second lead over Carl Edwards. After 15 laps, that gap grew to two seconds. After 30 laps, the gap grew to four seconds. The first caution of the race flew on lap 41. It was a scheduled competition caution due to overnight rain. Edwards exited pit road with the race lead.

The race restarted on lap 46. Harvick dove underneath Edwards going into turn 1 to retake the lead on lap 48. The second caution of the race flew on lap 118 for a single-car wreck on the backstretch. Exiting turn 2, Matt DiBenedetto got loose and slammed the wall. He would go on to finish 40th. Edwards exited pit road with the race lead. Denny Hamlin was tagged for improper fueling and restarted the race from the tail-end of the field.

Second quarter
The race restarted on lap 125. Matt Kenseth took the lead on lap 132 before ceding it back to Edwards on lap 133. The third caution of the race flew on lap 143 for a single-car spin in turn 4. Rounding the turn, Regan Smith got loose and made contact with the wall. Martin Truex Jr. opted not to pit under the caution and assumed the race lead.

The race restarted on lap 152. Debris in turn 1 brought out the fourth caution of the race on lap 172. Greg Biffle opted not to pit under the caution and assumed the race lead. Ryan Newman was tagged for an uncontrolled tire and restarted the race from the tail-end of the field.

The race restarted on lap 179. Kyle Larson drove underneath Biffle into turn 3 to take the lead on lap 182. The fifth caution of the race flew on lap 183 for a single-car wreck in turn 3. Going into the turn, Austin Dillon suffered a right-front brake rotor failure and slammed the wall. He said afterwards that he thought "it was the brakes. I was complaining about them before that, having to pump them up. I am just frustrated. We had the same issue at Bristol and we come here and we have another issue with the brakes. I'm frustrated, but we had a good car. Our Chevrolet was fast and we had good shot of running top 10, top-five depending on track position."

The race restarted on lap 191. The sixth caution of the race flew on lap 212 for a single-car spin in turn 1. Reed Sorenson blew an engine in turn 1 and spun around. Jimmie Johnson ran through the oil and spun out as well. Hamlin opted not to pit under the caution and assumed the race lead. Jamie McMurray was tagged for speeding on pit road and restarted the race from the tail-end of the field.

Second half

Halfway
The race restarted on lap 220. The seventh caution of the race flew for a single-car wreck on the frontstretch. Exiting turn 4, McMurray got into Michael Annett and sent him into the outside wall. Annett's car then came down across the track and slammed the inside wall.

The race restarted on lap 231. Brad Keselowski got by Hamlin in turn 3 to take the lead on lap 232. After 20 laps of battling back and forth, Larson drove by Keselowski exiting turn 2 to retake the lead on lap 281. Debris on the frontstretch brought out the eighth caution of the race with 113 laps to go.

The race restarted with 107 laps to go. Debris on the frontstretch brought out the ninth caution of the race with 102 laps to go.

Fourth quarter

The race restarted with 98 laps to go. After battling for 10 laps, Martin Truex Jr. passed Larson rounding turn 2 to take the lead with 70 laps to go. The 10th caution of the race came with 58 laps to go after Tony Stewart broke a track bar, which punctured the rear gear, spilling rear end grease in turn 1 and Chris Buescher spun out. Johnson exited pit road with the race lead. Under the caution, Johnson led his three-thousandth career lap at Dover.

The race restarted with 46 laps to go and a multi-car wreck just past the start/finish line brought out the 11th caution of the race. Johnson's car stalled out, fell backwards and caused an 18-car wreck. Johnson, Truex, Harvick, McMurray, Newman, A. J. Allmendinger, Ricky Stenhouse Jr., Kyle Busch, Joey Logano, Aric Almirola, Hamlin, Biffle, Casey Mears, Dale Earnhardt Jr., Clint Bowyer, Trevor Bayne, Paul Menard and Michael McDowell were all collected in the wreck. Johnson said afterwards that as soon as he "went from second and tried to go into third, I kind of got up into the neutral gate of the transmission and it didn't even want to go to third," Johnson said. "It stopped before it ever went to third. And then I tried fourth and third and eventually I got hit from behind...I thought maybe I missed a shift, but it wouldn't go into gear. Martin was good and patient with me. He gave me a couple of opportunities to try to find a gear but it just locked out and wouldn't go into gear for some reason." The subsequent cleanup forced the red flag to fly. The red flag was lifted after 11 minutes and 22 seconds.

The race restarted with 41 laps to go and the 12th caution of the race flew for a single-car wreck on the backstretch. Exiting turn 2, Edwards came down on Larson, got hooked into the inside wall. He said afterwards that he "was trying to give Kurt (Busch) a little room, it looked like he got choked up and as I looked at the replay it looked like I moved down a little and Larson got underneath me. I don't think he meant to do it, but it surprised me. I didn't know he was that close. We'll just chalk it up to racing, but the hard part is we felt like we were going to win that million bucks for those kids and I felt like we could win this race. It's tough not to be out there."

The race restarted with 35 laps to go. Despite a hard-fought battle towards the finish with Larson and Chase Elliott, Kenseth – who assumed the lead after the multi-car wreck with 46 laps to go – drove on to score the victory.

Post-race

Driver comments
Kenseth said after the race that he "had a good car today. I thought we were competitive and there were a few guys at different parts of the race that were a little bit better and Kyle (Larson) gave me all I wanted at the end, and then some. We were fortunate to be able to hold him off."

Larson said that he "got close to his (Kenseth's) bumper a couple of times. I may have gotten into him once. But I'm not going to do anything dirty. I respect Matt Kenseth a lot. He always races me with respect, and I try to do the same with him. I tried to race him as hard as I could without getting into him to beat him."

A dejected Elliott said after the race that he "couldn't be on the good end of (a great race) but proud of our effort today. We really started a good ways out of where we needed to be. I thought we made a lot of really, really solid gains throughout the day to get our car better and better. ... Hate to not get the job done and be so close, but we'll keep digging at it and try to get a little better."

Race results

Race summary
 Lead changes: 19 among different drivers
 Cautions: 12 for 65 laps
 Red flags: 1 for 11 minutes and 22 seconds    
 Time of race: 3 hours, 39 minutes and 29 seconds
 Average speed:

Media

Television
Fox Sports covered their sixteenth race at the Dover International Speedway. Mike Joy, five-time Dover winner Jeff Gordon and two-time Dover winner Darrell Waltrip had the call in the booth for the race. Jamie Little, Vince Welch and Matt Yocum handled the action on pit road for the television side.

Radio
MRN had the radio call for the race which was also be simulcasted on Sirius XM NASCAR Radio.

Standings after the race

Drivers' Championship standings

Manufacturers' Championship standings

Note: Only the first 16 positions are included for the driver standings.. – Driver has clinched a Chase position.

References

AAA 400 Drive for Autism
AAA 400 Drive for Autism
Sociological and cultural aspects of autism
NASCAR races at Dover Motor Speedway
AAA 400 Drive for Autism